Manjakandriana District is a district in central Madagascar. It is part of Analamanga Region. Its capital is Manjakandriana.

Communes
The district is further divided into 23 communes:

 Alarobia
 Ambanitsena
 Ambatolaona
 Ambatomanga, Manjakandriana
 Ambatomena, Manjakandriana
 Ambohibary, Manjakandriana
 Ambohitrandriamanitra
 Ambohitrolomahitsy
 Ambohitrony
 Ambohitseheno
 Anjepy
 Anjoma Betoho
 Ankazondandy
 Antsahalalina
 Manjakandriana
 Mantasoa
 Merikanjaka
 Miadanandriana
 Nandihizana
 Ranovao
 Sadabe
 Sambaina
 Soavinandriana, Manjakandriana

References

Districts of Analamanga